Vishal Karwal  is an Indian television-film actor. He has played some of the famous serials like Dwarkadheesh Bhagwaan Shree Krishn, Rishton Se Badi Pratha, Ek Hazaaron Mein Meri Behna Hai and Rangrasiya. He participated in MTV Roadies, MTV Splitsvilla and Bigg Boss. He has also appeared in a lead role in Vikram Bhatt's horror thriller 1920 London in 2016.

Early life
Vishal Karwal was born in Himachal Pradesh, India in a Punjabi family. His father owns a store that deals with jewelry and precious stones, and earlier used to be a chairman of a school. His mother is a homemaker. He was raised in a joint family in Palampur, Himachal Pradesh. When he was 10 years old, he was admitted to a boarding school, Dalhousie Public School, in Dalhousie, Himachal Pradesh. He studied the Bachelor in Engineering degree course to become a computer science engineer.  He is also a trained commercial pilot, having completed a pilot training course from Texas, United States in October 2008.

Career

Television
Karwal is famous for portraying the role of Lord Krishna in three serials Dwarkadheesh - Bhagwaan Shri Krishn, Naagarjuna - Ek Yodha and Paramavtar Shri Krishn. Karwal came into limelight after he participated in a youth entertainment adventure reality TV show, MTV Roadies Season 4, aired on MTV India in 2006. He was voted out of the show in the episode 4. In 2008, he appeared on the same TV channel for another youth reality TV show MTV Splitsvilla Season 1, where he emerged as the winner. Continuing his spree with MTV India, he hosted a show called Couplesutra. Various offers poured to him from the Indian TV industry.

He, then, became associated with the TV channel Colors and did two TV series in a row. He first worked for the TV show Bhagyavidhata that hit the small screens in May 2009. However, he quit as the show took a 15-year leap and wanted to portray him much older than his actual age. Colors next signed him up for the TV program, Rishton Se Badi...Pratha. The show went on air in November 2010. The TV series attempted to highlight social events inspired by real-life incidents.

Karwal was next seen on Imagine TV's TV program, Dwarkadheesh – Bhagwaan Shree Krishn, based on the famous Indian history Mahabharata, where he played the lead role of the Hindu Lord, Krishna. The series was telecasted July 2011 onwards. Vishal revealed, "This show really got me into acting. I loved doing the show and started enjoying acting."

In November 2012, he participated in celebrity reality TV show, Bigg Boss Season 6 on Colors, as a wild card contestant. Before entering the Bigg Boss show, he said in an interview, "Being a part of Bigg Boss is a big thing. This reality show is really unique and interesting than other reality shows." He was voted out of the show in December 2012 after spending about 40 days in the Bigg Boss house, and he said in an interview with PTI, "I was not expecting to be evicted. I wanted to stay on the show longer." Though during the show, he was shown as not actively participating in the game-related politics, fights, or tasks, rather he reserved himself to lying on the sun bed a lot of the time. Nonetheless, his interest in a co-contestant, Sana Khan, gained some curiosity from the viewers.

In 2013, he replaced Akshay Dogra and played the role of Devender, cousin brother of Jeevim (Krystle D'Souza) and Manvi (Nia Sharma). He worked with the TV channel Colors yet again for one episode of their comedy show Nautanki - The Comedy Theatre that went on air in February 2013 to make a guest appearance.

Karwal has emphasized that he likes to do different roles on TV, where he can do something new with each role. He said, "The element of freshness in doing different things interests me. Also, I like to experiment with what I do because otherwise doing only one serial gets monotonous." He also worked in Rangrasiya, a Colors TV show opposite Sanaya Irani, portraying a negative role in the series. His role was appreciated amongst TV viewers, and the show ended in 2014. After the venture, he also portrayed the character of Rajveer Singh Ranawat, one of the primary antagonists in the show Jamai Raja on Zee TV alongside Nia Sharma and Ravi Dubey.

Film career
Karwal made his debut in the film industry with the Punjabi film, Aappan Pher Milange, which was released in May 2012 and starred alongside Gracy Singh in this movie. At a promotional event of the film, he said, "After doing television, I wanted to stretch my horizon. Punjabi films is an excellent medium of doing so. The way its reach is growing, it should be giving competition to Bollywood very soon," The film, however, failed to do any good business at the box office.

In 2016, Karwal made his bollywood debut with Vikram Bhatt 's horror thriller 1920 London, following the successful series of 1920 (film series), co-starring Sharman Joshi and Meera Chopra in the pivotal roles. His portrayal is of Veer Singh, who is a possessed husband of Shivangi (played by Meera Chopra). The film was released on 6 May 2016.

Business plans
About his future plans, he told Deccan Chronicle in November 2012, "I have a couple of Punjabi films lined up and a few serial projects as well."   Calling this venture as his dream project, he acknowledged, "I cannot depend on acting forever, there has to be something else to bank upon."

Personal life
In an interview with The Times of India, he said, "If not an actor, I would have been a pilot. I still miss flying," and further added, "Hopefully, I will get to convert my American flying license to the Indian license soon so that I will fly once again." Vishal is also a fitness freak. At the TV show Bigg Boss, he said, "I'm interested in fitness very much. I work out and run 3 miles everyday." Vishal maintains that stardom is very temporary and that he leads a simple life. He acknowledged, "Till you are young and are bagging good roles, everyone wants to be associated with you. Once you are out of work, nobody really cares." He has a brother named Aditya Karwal and an older sister Raima Karwal Luthra.

In October 2020, Karwal married Heena Suri.

Filmography
 denotes Film yet to be released

Television

References

External links 

 
 

Living people
Indian male television actors
Participants in Indian reality television series
Male actors in Punjabi cinema
21st-century Indian male actors
Male actors from Himachal Pradesh
Commercial aviators
1985 births
Bigg Boss (Hindi TV series) contestants
MTV Roadies contestants